Lives in the Balance is the eighth album by American singer-songwriter Jackson Browne, released in 1986 (see 1986 in music). It reached number 23 on The Billboard 200 chart. The title track as well as "For America" and "In the Shape of a Heart" were released as singles. The album was ranked number 88 on Rolling Stone's list of the best 100 albums of the 1980s. The album reached number 2 in Sweden.

History
Lives in the Balance was the first album by Browne where overtly political and socially critical songs dominated (three of which were about president Ronald Reagan), although it also included one of his best remembered songs about relationships, the tragic "In the Shape of a Heart", inspired by his relationship with his first wife. The radio play garnered by "For America" and "In the Shape of a Heart", and the use of "Lives in the Balance" in the show Miami Vice, gained him many new fans who later went back and discovered Browne's earlier works.

The lesser commercial success of the album, according to a Rolling Stone November 1989 article, hardly mattered to Browne: "I like this album as much as any I've ever done," Browne said. "And there's a certain comfort, a security that I have, talking about something that I feel this strongly about. And whether or not an album succeeds wildly or not, that's intact."

The album was certified as a gold record in 1986 by the RIAA.

Reception

Critical press focused on the political direction of Lives in the Balance. Music critic William Rulhmann wrote retrospectively "...if Browne sounded more involved in his music than he had in some time, the specificity of its approach inevitably limited its appeal and its long-term significance."

Critic Robert Christgau also commented in a similar vein: "The difference is that Browne shouldn't be doing this... he's a pop star who's stretching his audience and endangering his market share merely by making such a statement in 1986. And he's thought hard getting here—not only does his way with words render these lyrics somewhat deeper than Holly Near's, but his moralistic put-downs have that edge of righteous anger nobody's yet found the formula for." The Rolling Stone Record Guide wrote that "the title track is a cutting slice of social observation, but the remainder of the album is muddled. For the first time, Browne seems unsure of himself."

However, the original 1986 Rolling Stone review by Jimmy Guterman praised the album over-all in part because of Browne's "new-found ability to link the personal to the political," which "breathes life" into the songs and "prevents them from becoming too didactic. Browne's not just writing about the headlines; he's trying to tell the stories of the people they affect."

Track listing
All tracks composed by Browne except where noted.

Personnel 
The list of contributors is as follows.
 Jackson Browne – lead vocals, vocoder (1), acoustic guitar (2, 3, 6), sequencing (2, 6), acoustic piano (4), harmony vocals (6)
 Jai Winding – acoustic piano (1), synthesizers (1, 4, 5, 6, 8), organ (5)
 Bill Payne – synthesizers (2, 3, 4, 6), acoustic piano (8)
 Danny Kortchmar – sequencing (2), guitar (5)
 Craig Doerge – synthesizers (3)
 Bernie Larsen – clavinet (7), guitar (7)
 Ian McLagan – organ (7)
 Gary Myrick – guitar (1)
 Steve Lukather – guitar (2, 4, 8)
 Rick Vito – guitar (3)
 David Lindley – guitar (5, 7)
 Waddy Wachtel – guitar (5)
 Jorge Strunz – nylon-string acoustic guitar (6)
 Hugo Pedroza – charango (6), tiple (6)
 Kevin McCormick – guitar (7), harmony vocals (7)
 Kevin Dukes – guitar (8)
 Jennifer Condos – bass (1)
 Bob Glaub – bass (2, 3, 4, 6, 8)
 Jorge Calderón – bass (5), harmony vocals (5)
 Phil Chen – bass (7)
 Ian Wallace – drums (1, 7)
 Russ Kunkel – drums (2, 4, 6, 8)
 Stan Lynch – drums (3)
 Jim Keltner – drums (5)
 Walfredo Reyes Jr. –  congas (5)
 Phil Kenzie – alto saxophone (1)
 Enrique "Quique" Cruz – zampona (6)
 Doug Haywood – harmony vocals (3, 4, 7, 8)
 Bonnie Raitt – harmony vocals (4)
 Debra Dobkin – harmony vocals (6)
 Mindy Sterling – harmony vocals (6)

Production
 Producer – Jackson Browne
 Production Assistant – Steven Landsberg
 Engineer – James Geddes 
 Assistant Engineers – Tchad Blake, Bill Jackson and Coke Johnson.
 Technical Engineer – Ed Wong 
 Mixing – James Geddes and Greg Ladanyi
 Mix Assistants – Murray Dvorkin and Sharon Rice
 Mixed at The Complex (Los Angeles, CA).
 Mastered by Doug Sax at The Mastering Lab (Los Angeles, CA).
 Art Direction – Dawn Patrol and Jimmy Wachtel
 Cover Artwork – Richard Duardo 
 Back Cover Photo – Basia Kenton

Charts
Album – Billboard (United States)

Singles – Billboard (United States)

See also
Ronald Reagan in music

References

Jackson Browne albums
1986 albums
Asylum Records albums
Albums with cover art by Jimmy Wachtel
Political music albums by American artists